Agatha Dietschi, also known as Hans Kaiser and Schnitter Hensli (died after 1547), was a German charged for having lived her life as a man and married a woman. Her case is regarded as an important one in the history of prosecution of homosexuals.

Life
Agatha Dietschi was from Wehingen, where she was married to a man. At one point, she appeared at the village of Niedingen by the Danube dressed as a man under the name Hans Kaiser or Schnitter Hensli, and married a woman with children. After some absence, she returned without wife and children, who she claimed had died. She remarried Anna Reuli in 1538 and the couple settled in Freiburg im Breisgau. The couple lived happily until 1547, when her wife wished to marry her lover Max Cross, and wanted to have the marriage dissolved; Reuli revealed Dietschi to her brother-in-law, who reported Dietschi to the authorities.

Agatha Dietschi was arrested and charged for heresy, suspected of being a homosexual. It was unusual for women to be prosecuted for homosexuality, but when they were, they were charged with heresy just like their male counterparts, which is illustrated by the rare case against Agatha Dietschi. However, as sexual intercourse was defined as penetration, women were convicted only if they had penetrated each other with a dildo, which happened in the case of Catherine de la Maniere and Francoise de l'Estrage in France in 1537, and against an unnamed woman in Basel the same year. In the case of Agatha Dietschi, witnesses claimed to have seen Ditschi and Reuli involved in sexual activity in a barn, and evidence was presented that she had manufactured a dildo. However, Max Cross insisted that Reuli was a virgin, and the court ruled that the dildo in question was useless for penetration.

Agatha Dietschi was therefore spared the death penalty. She was instead pilloried, and exiled from the city.

See also
 Katherina Hetzeldorfer

Notes

References
 Helmut Puff: Sodomy in Reformation Germany and Switzerland, 1400-1600
 Katherine Crawford: European Sexualities, 1400-1800

German LGBT people
16th-century German people
People prosecuted under anti-homosexuality laws
16th-century LGBT people
16th-century German women